Paul Hunt is a gymnastics coach and gymnastics clown.  Hunt has performed comedic women's gymnastics routines, including the uneven bars, floor exercises, and the balance beam since 1980. He has performed on US and international television, including Wide World of Sports and America's Funniest Videos.

He was born in Illinois and now lives in Murray, Utah. For over thirty years, he ran Hunt's Gymnastics Academy (a.k.a. Hunt's Gym) in Salt Lake City until it closed at the end of December 2020 due to lost revenue from the COVID-19 pandemic. With the closure of his academy he decided to retire.

Hunt was a competitive men's gymnast at the University of Illinois in the early 1970s. He won the Big Ten Conference individual championship in the floor exercise in 1971, and had another win in the floor exercise in 1973. He was the 1972 U.S. National Floor Exercise champion.

Hunt started coaching gymnastics in Utah in 1974. While demonstrating a backflip for a female student, he realized the comic value of a man performing women's gymnastics. He performed his complex routines during gymnastics competitions for comic relief, wearing a skirted leotard and often calling himself Paulina Huntesque, Pauletta Huntenova, Paulette Huntinova or some similar variation. Often he would sport his thick mustache.

References

Place of birth missing (living people)
Year of birth missing (living people)
Living people
21st-century American comedians
American gymnastics coaches
American male artistic gymnasts
Illinois Fighting Illini men's gymnasts
People from Murray, Utah
Sportspeople from Utah